Phillip Calvert may refer to:

Phill Calvert (born 1958), Australian musician
Phillip Calvert (governor) (c. 1626–1682), fifth governor of Maryland
Philip Powell Calvert (1871–1961), American entomologist